Habla, mudita is a 1973 Spanish drama film directed by Manuel Gutiérrez Aragón. It was entered into the 23rd Berlin International Film Festival. It was also selected as the Spanish entry for the Best Foreign Language Film at the 46th Academy Awards, but was not accepted as a nominee.

Cast
 José Luis López Vázquez - Rodrigo
 Kiti Manver - La Muda
 Francisco Algora - El Mudo
 Hanna Haxmann
 Francisco Guijar
 Susan Taff
 Marisa Porcel
 Rosa de Alba
 Edy Lage
 María de la Riva
 Pedrín Fernández
 Lucy Tiller
 Manuel Guitián
 Carmen Liaño
 Vicente Roca

See also
 List of submissions to the 46th Academy Awards for Best Foreign Language Film
 List of Spanish submissions for the Academy Award for Best Foreign Language Film

References

External links

1973 films
1970s Spanish-language films
1973 drama films
Films directed by Manuel Gutiérrez Aragón
Spanish drama films
1970s Spanish films